Yulieth Paola Domínguez Ochoa (born 6 September 1993) is a Colombian football defender who plays for the Colombia women's national football team. She represented Colombia at the 2011 FIFA Women's World Cup and 2012 Summer Olympics. At the club level, she played for Estudiantes F.C.

See also
 Colombia at the 2012 Summer Olympics

References

External links
 
 Profile at sports-reference.com

1993 births
Living people
Women's association football defenders
Colombian women's footballers
Place of birth missing (living people)
Colombia women's international footballers
Olympic footballers of Colombia
Footballers at the 2012 Summer Olympics
2011 FIFA Women's World Cup players
21st-century Colombian women